Kepa Hamuera Anaha Ehau (5 November 1885 – 10 February 1970) was a New Zealand tribal leader, law clerk, interpreter, soldier, historian, orator. He was born on November 5, 1885.

References

1885 births
1970 deaths
Interpreters
20th-century New Zealand historians
New Zealand Māori public servants
Te Arawa people
Ngāti Whakaue people
20th-century translators